Chhattisgarh Pradesh Congress Committee (CPCC) is the state wing of Indian National Congress serving in Chhattisgarh.
Mohan Markam is currently president of the Congress party in Chhattisgarh.

Chhattisgarh Legislative Assembly election

List of presidents

List of the chief ministers of Chhattisgarh from the Indian National Congress

Following is the list of the chief ministers of Chhattisgarh from Indian National Congress since the formation of the state on 9 November 2000:

Faction

Janta Congress Chhattisgarh (Jogi)

Former Chief Minister of Chhattisgarh Ajit Jogi, after being expelled from the Congress Party due to anti-party activities as well as sabotaging a bypoll election in Antagarh, founded his own new party named Janta Congress Chhattisgarh on 23 June 2016. The Party contested 2018 Chhattisgarh Legislative Assembly election in alliance with Bahujan Samaj Party but could secure only 5 seats while BSP got only 2 seats.

See also
 Indian National Congress
 Congress Working Committee
 All India Congress Committee
 Pradesh Congress Committee

Notes

References

Politics of Chhattisgarh
Indian National Congress by state or union territory